The Second Lyons ministry (United Australia) was the 21st ministry of the Government of Australia. It was led by the country's 10th Prime Minister, Joseph Lyons. The Second Lyons ministry succeeded the First Lyons ministry, which dissolved on 12 October 1934 following the federal election that took place in September. However, it was a minority government relying on support from the Country Party in order to remain in office. The ministry was replaced by the Third Lyons ministry on 9 November 1934 after Lyons entered into a formal Coalition with Earle Page and his Country Party; the second such coalition after that of the Bruce government.

Robert Menzies, who died in 1978, was the last surviving member of the Second Lyons ministry; Menzies was also the last surviving member of the Third Lyons ministry.

Ministry

References

Ministries of George V
Lyons, 2
1934 establishments in Australia
1934 disestablishments in Australia
Cabinets established in 1934
Cabinets disestablished in 1934